In Old California may refer to:
In Old California (1910 film), silent film by Biograph Studios and the first film shot in Hollywood, California
In Old California (1929 film), an early sound film directed by Burton L. King
In Old California (1942 film), film starring John Wayne

In Old California may also refer to:
Donald Duck in Old California!, a comic story written and illustrated by Carl Barks